ESPP may refer to:
 Employee stock purchase plan
 The European Society for Philosophy and Psychology, a professional organization of philosophers and cognitive scientists
 Euclidean shortest path problem in computer science; finding a route between two points while avoiding obstacles